This article displays the rosters for the participating teams at the 2006 FIBA Africa Under-20 Championship for Women.

|}
| valign="top" |
 Head coach

 Assistant coach

Legend
 (C) Team captain
 Club field describes current club
|}

|}
| valign="top" |
 Head coach

 Assistant coach

Legend
 (C) Team captain
 Club field describes current club
|}

|}
| valign="top" |
 Head coach

 Assistant coach

Legend
 (C) Team captain
 Club field describes current club
|}

|}
| valign="top" |
 Head coach

 Assistant coach

Legend
 (C) Team captain
 Club field describes current club
|}

|}
| valign="top" |
 Head coach

 Assistant coach

Legend
 (C) Team captain
 Club field describes current club
|}

See also
 2006 FIBA Africa U-20 Championship squads

References

External links
Official Site
Teams

FIBA Africa Under-20 Championship for Women
2006 in African basketball
2006 in youth sport